Vietcombank Tower is a skyscraper in Ho Chi Minh City. It is 206 meters (675,8 ft) tall and has a floor area of  3.232m²

and has 35 above ground floors and 4 underground floors, and is the 7th tallest building in Vietnam and the 3rd in Ho Chi Minh City. It is the headquarters of Vietcombank. The architect is Pelli Clarke Pelli.

Construction
Construction started in 2010, and the building was finished in 2015.

Reference 

Buildings and structures in Ho Chi Minh City
Skyscrapers in Vietnam